Father Shay Cullen (born 27 March 1943) is an Irish missionary priest and the founder of the PREDA Foundation. He is a member of the Columbans, an Irish order founded in honour of and named after St. Columba (St. Columcille), the 6th. Centuary Irish monk who founded the famous Iona mother house monastery on Iona, Inner Hebrides, Scotland Missionary Society of St. Columban. He was educated near his home at Harold's Boys and the Presentation Brothers in Glasthule, and CBC Monkstown Park.

He helped found PREDA in 1974 along with Alex Corpus Hermoso and Merly Ramirez. This small non-profit organisation has a number of purposes, including the promotion and protection of the human rights of the Filipino people, especially  women and children. Cullen is a member of the Missionary Society of St. Columban.

The Preda Foundation and Cullen were awarded the Human Rights Award from the City of Weimar in 2000. Preda cooperates closely with international legal tribunals, Interpol and the UN Commission on Human Rights. In 2017, Cullen was awarded with the Martin Buber plaque at the Euriade, the international festival for dialogue.

References

External links

Living people
Irish humanitarians
1943 births
20th-century Irish Roman Catholic priests
Missionary Society of St. Columban
People educated at C.B.C. Monkstown
21st-century Filipino Roman Catholic priests